Isaiah Butch Morris (born April 2, 1969) is a retired American professional basketball player. Morris played 25 games for the Detroit Pistons of the National Basketball Association (NBA) in the 1992-93 season. He played college basketball for San Jacinto College and the Arkansas Razorbacks.

Professional career
Morris played two season with the University of Arkansas before being selected by the Miami Heat in the 2nd round (10th pick, 37th overall) of the 1992 NBA Draft. Morris played 25 games for the Detroit Pistons in the 1992-93 NBA season, averaging 2.2 points per game.

A six-foot, eight-inch tall forward, Morris then moved overseas for the most of the remainder of his career, playing in Venezuela, Spain, Uruguay, Poland, Yugoslavia (with Red Star Belgrade), Russia, Dominican Republic, Greece, Cyprus and Puerto Rico.  He returned to Arkansas to play for the Arkansas Aeros of the ABA in the 2006-07 season.

Morris was represented in his Basketball career by Gary Ebert.

References

1969 births
Living people
African-American basketball players
American expatriate basketball people in Argentina
American expatriate basketball people in Chile
American expatriate basketball people in Cyprus
American expatriate basketball people in Greece
American expatriate basketball people in Italy
American expatriate basketball people in Poland
American expatriate basketball people in Russia
American expatriate basketball people in Serbia
American expatriate basketball people in Spain
American expatriate basketball people in Venezuela
American men's basketball players
Apollon Limassol BC players
Aris B.C. players
Arkansas Razorbacks men's basketball players
Basketball players from Richmond, Virginia
BC Avtodor Saratov players
CB Peñas Huesca players
Detroit Pistons players
Fort Wayne Fury players
Greek Basket League players
Guaiqueríes de Margarita players
KK Crvena zvezda players
Liga ACB players
Maratonistas de Coamo players
Miami Heat draft picks
Peñarol de Mar del Plata basketball players
San Jacinto Central Ravens men's basketball players
Small forwards
Stal Ostrów Wielkopolski players
Tri-City Chinook players
Trotamundos B.B.C. players
American expatriate basketball people in the Philippines
Barangay Ginebra San Miguel players
Philippine Basketball Association imports
TNT Tropang Giga players
21st-century African-American people
20th-century African-American sportspeople